Narayan Holiyappa Gouda (1938–1992) was a M.L.A to the Karnataka state Legislative Assembly, Bangalore from 1985-1989. He was elected from the Janata Dal. At that time Ramakrishna Hegde from the Janata party was the Chief Minister of Karnataka.

References

1938 births
1992 deaths
Kannada people
People from Uttara Kannada
Karnataka MLAs 1985–1989